, also known by his Chinese style name , was a bureaucrat of the Ryukyu Kingdom.

He was the ninth head of an aristocrat family, Ba-uji Yonabaru Dunchi. He was dispatched to China to pay tribute together with Ryō Kō in 1762, and was sent to Satsuma to report this in 1665.

Yonabaru served as a member of the sanshikan from 1769 to 1796. He managed to run the country by Confucianism, and earned the nickname . He put forward a proposal to make the first statutory law in Ryukyuan history together with his two colleagues, Miyahira Ryōtei and Wakugawa Chōkyō, and the sessei Yuntanza Chōkō in 1775. This proposal was approved by King Shō Boku. The law was completed by Ie Chōkei and Kōchi Ryōtoku in 1786. It was called Ryūkyū Karitsu, and was jointly signed by Yonabaru and his two colleagues, Fukuyama Chōki and Ie Chōkei. It was officially promulgated and implemented by the king in the same year.

Yonabaru was skilled at ryūka poetry.

References

1718 births
1797 deaths
Sanshikan
People of the Ryukyu Kingdom
Ryukyuan people
18th-century Ryukyuan people